Paulina Rivoli (22 July 1823 – 12 October 1881) was a Polish operatic soprano who had an active international career with important European opera houses from 1837–1860.

Rivoli was born in Vilnius, Lithuania.  She was particularly associated with the operas of Daniel Auber, Domenico Cimarosa, Stanisław Moniuszko, and Carl Maria von Weber.  She died, aged 58, in Warsaw.

1823 births
1881 deaths
Polish operatic sopranos
19th-century Polish women opera singers
Musicians from Vilnius